Albemarle High School is a public high school serving grades 9 through 12. It is a part of Albemarle County Public Schools and is located just outside Charlottesville, Virginia, United States.  The principal is Darah Bonham, appointed in 2019.

Albemarle High School offers Advanced Placement and dual enrollment classes through nearby Piedmont Virginia Community College.
High school students can also study at CATEC, a joint program with Albemarle County Public Schools and Charlottesville City Public Schools where classes are focused on technical education, as well as MESA, or the Math, Engineering, and Science Academy, where students take accelerated math and science courses along with their regular classes.
Adult Education and LED programs are offered in the evening.

Extracurriculars
Examples include:
 Student Council
 Academic Team
 Black Student Union
 National Honor Society
 Math Honor Society (Mu Alpha Theta)
 Science National Honor Society
 National English Honor Society
 National Art Honor Society
 Tri-M Music Honor Society
 International Thespian Honor Society
 Junior Classical League
 Spanish National Honor Society
 French National Honor Society
 German National Honor Society-Delta Epsilon Phi
 National Beta Club
 Key Club
 Gender-Sexuality Alliance
 Math Club
 Young Asian Americans and Pacific Islanders of Charlottesville
 Young Progressives

MESA
With a recent addition to the school in 2009 came the addition of a new program for students interested in engineering-related careers.  The program, called the Math, Engineering, and Science Academy (MESA), opened for the 2009–2010 school year, inviting approximately 50 rising freshmen and 25 rising juniors.  These students were selected by an application which included essays, transcripts, and teacher recommendations.  MESA offers an accelerated curriculum which allows students to earn 3 science credits and 3 math credits in 2 years. The junior and senior part of the program earns 4 dual enrollment credits and 4 high school credits in 2 years. The curriculum blends math and science against an engineering and application focus. Collaborative project based learning, robotics, research and competitions are all part of the MESA environment. Students
use calculus, physics and chemistry to solve problems analytically and verify their results empirically through experimentation using engineering modeling and analysis tools including MATLAB, Autodesk Inventor and Microsoft Excel at an expert level. In 2013, MESA students won the International Robotic Sailing Regatta beating every college team in attendance and advanced two students to the Intel International Science and Engineering Fair. Many MESA students have won the Virginia Piedmont Regional Science Fair in past years.

Notable alumni
 R. J. Archer, Arena Football League quarterback; quarterback for the Georgia Force
 Drew Atchison, former NFL tight end; was cut from the Dallas Cowboys; is now a teacher in Washington D.C.
 Steve Carter, Former MLB outfielder; played for the Pittsburgh Pirates
 Edward H. Deets, Rear Admiral in the United States Navy
 David Dillehunt, film director, television producer, and composer
 Mark Linkous, singer, songwriter, and musician; leader of the band Sparklehorse
 Brandon London, CFL wide receiver; signed by Montreal Alouettes; former NFL wide receiver; attended Albemarle before transferring to Fork Union Military Academy
 David Ian McKendry, filmmaker, screenwriter, and novelist; 
 James McNew, bass player; member of the band Yo La Tengo
 Nick Novak, scored 802 points in a 10-year NFL place-kicking career; attended the University of Maryland; finished career as the ACC's all-time leading scorer and 5th all-time in NCAA with 393 points; 13 seasons of professional football; 6th leading scorer in Chargers history; AHS Hall of Fame. 
 Tommy Toms, former MLB relief pitcher; played for the San Francisco Giants
 Walter White, former NFL tight end; played for the Kansas City Chiefs; recorded 808 receiving yards and 7 touchdowns in 1976
 Jason F. Wright, New York Times bestselling author, speaker and columnist.

Notable faculty
 Frankie Allen, current Maryland-Eastern Shore head basketball coach; former Varsity Basketball coach
 Al Groh, former University of Virginia head football coach; began coaching career as an assistant at Albemarle
 Susan Paxman, editor of progressive magazine Exponent II 1984–1997, winner of constitutional action over maternity rights in the 1970s
 Steve Robinson, former Florida State head basketball coach; coached at Albemarle during the 1982–1983 season
 Eric Wilson, former NFL linebacker; head coach of the JV Boys' Basketball team

References

External links

 Albemarle High School

Educational institutions established in 1953
Public high schools in Virginia
Schools in Albemarle County, Virginia
1953 establishments in Virginia